Princess Noriko (範子内親王; 4 December 1177 – 13 May 1210), also known as Hanshi, was an Empress of Japan. She was Empress as the Honorary Mother (准母) of her nephew Emperor Tsuchimikado of Japan.

She was the daughter of Emperor Takakura and Court Lady Kogō-no-Tsubone (小督局; b. 1157), Fujiwara no Shigenori's daughter. 
She was later known as Empress Dowager Bōmon-in (坊門院).

Notes

Japanese princesses
Japanese empresses
1177 births
1210 deaths